Michael Lang (born 4 July 1998) is an Austrian professional footballer who plays for Grazer AK as a defender.

Club career
Lang made his Austrian Football First League debut for SC Austria Lustenau on 4 August 2017 in a game against SC Wiener Neustadt.

On 22 June 2021, he moved to SKN St. Pölten on a two-year contract.

References

External links
 

1998 births
Living people
Association football defenders
Austrian footballers
SC Austria Lustenau players
Kapfenberger SV players
SKN St. Pölten players
2. Liga (Austria) players